, known by his stage name , is a Japanese TV presenter and rakugo artist.

Sanshi received this name from his shishô (master) and one of the celebrated postwar Kamigata Rakugo greats, . Sanshi's "san" came from, originally, being Bunshi's third deshi (pupil) and "shi" came from the second half of shishos stage name. Sanshi succeeded his shisho's stage name in 2012.

Earlier years 
Sanshi was born in Higashi-ward, Sakai, Osaka on 16 July 1943. His father died when he was an 11-month-old baby. Despite early unfortunate circumstances, his efforts in the entertainment business have brought him success.

Youth 
Sanshi entered Kansai University (Faculty of commerce), after graduating from Ichioka Commercial High School in Osaka. He immediately gained fans at University with his storytelling and humor, though he had no professional careers. After university, Sanshi entered the artistic school or Katsura Bunshi V and later signed with agents at Yoshimoto Kogyo.

TV presenter 
Sanshi worked as a master of ceremonies on:

Punch De Date 
An audience participation matching and marriage TV program produced by Kansai Telecasting Corporation and broadcast from 1973 to 1985 co-starring Kiyoshi Nishikawa. The show's opening catchphrase was "Hitome atta sono hi kara, koi no hana saku koto mo aru, mishiranu anata to mishiranu anata ni, date o torimotsu Punch De Date!" (approximate translation: Even though they are not acquainted with each other, the pairings will bring us shot-gun couples. Punch De Date makes amazing matches!).

Shinkonsan Irasshai 
An audience participation program featuring honeymoon couples. Using Sanshi's original pitch and tone, the opening phrase "Irasshai!" (Welcome!) was his trademark.

Filmography

Films
 Porco Rosso (1992), Mr. Piccolo (voice)
 Notomitori Samurai (2018), Tanuma Okitsugu

Television
Sanada Maru (2016), Sen no Rikyū

Recent Activities 
Sanshi is on the board of the Kamigata Rakugo Kyoukai (Rakugo artists and performers' Guild in Kansai region), and is the director of Yoshimoto Kogyo.

In the rakugo world, Sanshi is known mostly for his "New rakugo" (in Japanese "創作落語"). He has been a guest professor at Kansai University.

Sanshi School 
Sanshi has many deshi apprentices and all of them have been given stage names that have the "san" (number 3, 三), for example, Katsura SANpo, Katsura SANpu, Katsura SANpatsu, and so on.

Awards 
 2006 Osaka Culture Prize — Culture Special Prize

External links 

  

1943 births
People from Sakai, Osaka
Living people
Rakugoka
Kansai University alumni
Recipients of the Medal with Purple Ribbon